Ibrahim Abdul Ghafour El Orabi; 20 May 1931– 18 September 2019) was an Egyptian Army Lieutenant General and the 13th and former Chief of Staff of the Egyptian Armed Forces. He was a member of the Free Officers Movement, as defined by the Egyptian revolution of 1952. He served as the 7th Chief of Operations of the Armed Forces, the commander of the Second Field Army, commander of the 21st Armored Division, Commander of the Arab Forces in Iraq, and as the commander of the Egyptian Armoured Corps, which was deployed in the North Yemen Civil War. As the chief of staff of the Egyptian Armed Forces, Orabi was formerly the second highest-ranking military officer in all of the Egyptian Armed Forces.

Early life
Orabi was born in Gharbia in 1931 into a politically influential family. He was the relative of Ali Zaki El Orabi Pasha, former Minister of Public Knowledge and Minister of Transportation and Communications and head of the Parliament of Egypt in the period (7 May 1942 – 19 Dec 1944) and (17 June 1950 – 10 Dec 1952) during the reign of King Farouk I of Egypt, and brother of Nabil El Orabi, former Egypt's ambassador to the Russian Federation, and the relative of Mohamed Orabi, former Minister of Foreign Affairs of Egypt.

Education
Orabi received a Bachelor of Military Science from the Egyptian Military Academy in 1950, Master of Science from M. V. Frunze Military Academy in Moscow, and a Master of Science from the College of Military Commanders and Staff, as well as a PhD in military science from Nasser Military Academy, Fellow of the Higher War College.

Personal life 
Orabi has three children with his wife Leila: Khadija, Khaled, and Tarek. The sons have served in the Egyptian General Intelligence. Tarek remains on active duty. Orabi and his wife have nine grandchildren.

Military education
1950 Bachelor of Military Science degree, Egyptian Military Academy, Heliopolis, Cairo
1961 Master of Military Art and Science degree, M.V. Frunze Military Academy, Moscow, Soviet Union
1972 PhD of Military Science, Joint Command and Staff College, Cairo, Egypt
1977 Fellowship of the Higher War College, Nasser's Military Sciences Academy, Egypt

Dates of rank

Career
In 1950, Orabi began his service in the Armored Corps, then he joined the Free Officers Movement and participated in the Egyptian Revolution of 1952.

From 1963 to 1967, Orabi served as Commander of the Arab Forces in Iraq and Commander of the Armored Corps in Yemen war and then was appointed to the Field Marshal's Office.

In end 1968, Orabi was distributed on training branch, then he was promoted to assume the position of vice president of operations of the Second Field Army, and then suddenly he was appointed commander of the 21st  Armored Division.

From 1977 to 1981, Orabi was promoted to the rank of major general and was appointed assistant commander of the second field army.  He next served in the Second Field Army, where he was assigned to chief of staff, and then as commander of the Second Field Army.

On 4 March 1981, General Orabi was nominated by President Anwar Sadat to serve as chief of operations of the Armed Forces. He was next appointed assistant minister of defense in 1982.

President Hosni Mubarak nominated Orabi to be the Chief of the General Staff on 16 July 1983, and was promoted to the rank of lieutenant general. He has been confirmed by the Supreme Council of the Armed Forces. He took over from Army General Abd Rab El Naby Hafez on 16 July 1983. He serves with Gen. Salah Abd El Halim, former commander of the Second Field Army , who has become the next chief of operations of the Armed Forces.

In 1987, Orabi became chairman of the Arab Organization for Industrialization (AOI) until 1995, when he retired.

Military participations 
 Suez Crisis
 North Yemen Civil War
 Six-Day War
 War of Attrition
 Yom Kippur War

Awards and decorations

Orabi is the recipient of the following awards:

References

External links 

1931 births
2019 deaths
Egyptian Sunni Muslims
Egyptian generals
Egyptian Military Academy alumni
Free Officers Movement (Egypt)
Egyptian revolutionaries
Frunze Military Academy alumni
Egyptian people of the Yom Kippur War
20th-century Egyptian military personnel
Members of the Supreme Council of the Armed Forces
Chiefs of the General Staff (Egypt)